Iveria Khashuri is a Georgian association football club.

Iveria was played in Umaglesi Liga in 1990s until relegation in 1997. The club then played between Pirveli Liga and Regionuli Liga.

Recent seasons

Honours
Pirveli Liga
 Champion: 1991–92

External links
https://www.facebook.com/FCIveriaKhashuri Official Facebook Page

Iveria Khashuri